The Pichilemu City Council is the legislative body of the City of Pichilemu. The council meets in Pichilemu City Hall.

City Council
The City Council consists of seven members, including the Mayor. City council members and the Mayor are chosen by elections every 4 years. The city council is presided by the Mayor.

Pichilemu City Hall

The Pichilemu City Hall served as the city's administrative headquarters. It was constructed from 1891 until May 6, 1894.

The building was located in the Ángel Gaete street, in a terrain of  that descends suddenly from the street level. It was conformed by a 2-floors building, a zócalo, a complementary construction and a yard. The yard serves as car parking for the municipality trucks, has a store and the corral municipal.

The building was not constructed for that purpose, and worked as four separate parts rather than one unit.

The Pichilemu City Hall was scheduled to be renovated in 2011, by the Government of O'Higgins Region. According to the Municipality of Paredones, the Pichilemu City Hall "will be completely repaired." Mayor of Pichilemu Roberto Córdova said on a Pichilemu City Council meeting that the new City Hall will be constructed with the earthquake reconstruction funds, and it was expected that by late 2011, the construction work will begin.

The Municipalidad de Pichilemu building was demolished between December 2011 and January 2012. No construction work has begun as of March 2012.

List of councillors
 2012–2016
 Aldo Polanco Contreras
 Andrea Aranda Escudero
 Hugo Toro Galaz
 Mario Morales Cárceles
 Felipe Bustamante Olivares
 Marta Urzúa Pua
 Roberto Córdova — the mayor

 2008–2012
 Pedro Aldo Polanco Contreras
 Andrea Aranda Escudero
 Viviana Parraguez Ulloa
 Juan Cornejo Vargas
 Marta Urzúa Púa
 Patricio Morales Acevedo — since 1 September 2009
 Roberto Córdova Carreño — councillor until 1 September 2009; and mayor since that date
 Marcelo Cabrera Martínez — mayor-elect, occupied office between 18 May 2009 until 19 August 2009 until he was removed

 2004–2008
 Aldo Polanco Contreras
 Héctor Cornejo Galarce
 Víctor Rojas González — councillor until 2007, elected mayor by the council and then removed from office
 Hernán Garrido Salas
 Roberto Córdova Carreño
 Marcelo Cabrera Martínez — councillor until Rojas' removal as mayor, succeeding him
 Jorge Vargas González — mayor until 2007

 2000–2004
 Carlos Leyton Labarca
 Aldo Polanco Contreras
 Víctor Rojas González
 Roberto Córdova Carreño
 Washington Saldías González
 Jorge Vargas González — mayor

 1996–2000
 Carlos Leyton Labarca
 Aldo Polanco Contreras
 Washington Saldías González
 Mariano Polanco Galarce
 Mario Bichón Cáceres
 Jorge Vargas González — mayor

 1992–1996
 Mario Bichón Cáceres
 Mariano Polanco Galarce
 Aldo Polanco Contreras
 Raúl Tobar Pavez
 Orlando Cornejo Bustamante — mayor

References

 
Government of Pichilemu
City councils in Chile